Mahdia is a city in Tunisia.

Mahdia may also refer to:
Mahdia Governorate in Tunisia
Mahdia, Guyana
History of Mahdist Sudan
Mehdya, a city in Morocco

Mahdiyya or al-Mahdiyya may refer to:

 The Fatimid caliphate of Abdullah al-Mahdi Billah (909–934)
 Mahdist Sudan (1885–1899)

See also
Mahdist (disambiguation)